Taghenkoh-e Jonubi Rural District is a rural district (dehestan) in Taghenkoh District, Firuzeh County, Razavi Khorasan province, Iran. At the 2006 census, its population was 6,876, in 1,698 families. The rural district has 6 villages.

References 

Rural Districts of Razavi Khorasan Province
Firuzeh County